Kotański (feminine: Kotańska; plural: Kotańscy) is a Polish surname. Notable people with the surname include:

 Janusz Kotański (born 1957), Polish historian and ambassador
 Marek Kotański (1942–2002), Polish charity worker and campaigner

See also
 

Polish-language surnames